Pajonsuk (born Angkhan Chomphuphuang, 20 January 1980 in Lopburi, Thailand) is a Thai middleweight Muay Thai-kickboxer fighting out of Superpro Samui in Koh Samui, Thailand.  He is a former Lumpinee Stadium and three-time world Muay Thai champion.  As well as fighting in Muay Thai and kickboxing, Pajonsuk has also pursued an amateur boxing career, most recently participating in the 2008 Olympic Games representing Thailand.

Biography and career

Born in Lopburi, Pajonsuk began his Muay Thai education at the Lukprabart camp in Saraburi province aged six years old.  As a youngster he won Thai national championships at 28, 32 and 35 kg and became a hot prospect on the local scene.  Not one to be confined to just one sport, Pajonsuk also branched out into the Chinese art of Wushu, winning a gold medal in the -76 kg division at the Southeast Asian Games in Kuala Lumpur, Malaysia in 2001.  He would also travel to fight, winning his first ever world title (I.K.K.C) in the United States against the reigning champion and fellow countryman Matee Jedeepitak by TKO in mid-2002.  Fresh from his victory in America, Pajonsuk returned to Thailand where he faced Kaolan Kaovichit, a man who had defeated him in their two previous meetings, including in a world title fight.  This time Pajonsuk gained revenge by defeating Kaolan and becoming the new Lumpinee champion.   Earlier that year he returned to action at the 2002 Asian Games in Busan, South Korea to pick up his second gold medal in the art of Wushu.

At the end of 2003, Pajonsuk once more faced old foe Kaolan Kaovichit for the fourth and final time, losing his Lumpinee Stadium title by decision.  After this defeat he travelled to Europe for a new challenge, facing Stjepan Veselic for Veslic's W.P.K.L. world title belt.  Veselic had defending his title three times including an upset KO victory over Thai legend Sakmongkol Sithchuchok, but on the night in Rotterdam there was a new champion, Pajonsuk handing Vesilic a third round stoppage defeat.  As he was running out of competition in Thailand where traditionally the most competitive divisions were at lower weight, Pajonsuk would fight more and more in Europe, picking up wins against the likes of Joerie Mes and Alviar Lima and losing a close decision to Rayen Simson fighting on cards for reputable Dutch organizations such as It's Showtime and Gentlemen promotions.

In 2010, he entered the Enfusion Reality Show which involved some of the top Muay Thai fighters from across the world at 70 kg, with the first part of the show based at a training camp in Koh Samui, Thailand.  Pajonsuk won two elimination fights in Thailand against Jan van Denderen and Shane Campbell respectively making the final 4 stage in Lisbon where he lost in the battle for the $40,000 first prize to Gago Drago via decision.  By the end of 2010 Pajonsuk would make only his second appearance on a K-1 show.  There had been rumors throughout the year that he would replace regular Thai K-1 MAX representative Buakaw Por. Pramuk who would not participate in the final 16 stage due to a contract dispute with the organization but in the end the relatively unknown Sagetpetch would take his place and Pajonsuk would have to make do with a super fight appearance, beating Woo Yong Choi at the event in Seoul, South Korea.

Returning from a long lay off of over two years, Pajonsuk fought Michael Wakeling at Enfusion Live 3 in London, England on March 30, 2013. He lost by unanimous decision after an extra round.

He lost to Tayfun Ozcan via decision at Enfusion Live 5 in Eindhoven, Netherlands on May 11, 2013.

Amateur boxing career
Pajonsuk competed under his birthname of Angkhan Chomphuphuang in the welterweight (– 69 kg) division at the 2006 Asian Games settling for the silver medal in a lost bout against Kazakhstan's Bakhyt Sarsekbayev (8-28). He qualified for the 2008 Summer Olympics at middleweight among others knocking out Elshod Rasulov. He beat Cho Deok-Jin but was upset by Vijender Singh.

Titles

Muay Thai
2002-03 Lumpinee Stadium Muaythai welterweight champion -66.8 kg
2002 I.K.K.C. Pro Muaythai junior welterweight world champion -63.5 kg
W.M.C. Muaythai super middleweight world champion
2004 W.P.K.L. Muaythai middleweight world champion -72.5 kg

Kickboxing
2010 Enfusion Reality Show tournament runner up -70 kg

Sanda/Wushu
2001 Southeast Asian Games in Kuala Lumpur, Malaysia  -76 kg (Wushu)
2002 Asian Games in Busan, South Korea  -65 kg (Wushu)

Awards
 2002 Sports Writers Association of Thailand Fight of the Year (vs Namsaknoi Yudthagarngamtorn)

Boxing
2006 Asian Games in Doha, Qatar  -69 kg
2006 28th King's Cup Boxing Tournament in Bangkok, Thailand

Fight record

|-
|-  bgcolor="#FFBBBB"
| 2013-05-11 || Loss ||align=left| Tayfun Ozcan || Enfusion Live 5 || Eindhoven, Netherlands || Decision || 3 || 3:00
|-
|-  bgcolor="#FFBBBB"
| 2013-03-30 || Loss ||align=left| Michael Wakeling || Enfusion Live 3 || London, England || Ext.R Decision (unanimous) || 4 || 3:00
|-
|-  bgcolor="#FFBBBB"
| 2010-12-11 || Loss ||align=left| Andy Souwer || It's Showtime Athens 2010 || Athens, Greece || Decision (5-0) || 3 || 3:00 
|-
|-  bgcolor="#CCFFCC"
| 2010-10-03 || Win ||align=left| Woo Yong Choi || K-1 World MAX Final 16 - Part 2, Super Fight || Seoul, South Korea || Decision (Unanimous) || 3 || 3:00 
|-
|-  bgcolor="#FFBBBB"
| 2010-07-10 || Loss ||align=left| Gago Drago || Enfusion Kickboxing tournament '10, Final || Lisbon, Portugal || Decision || 3 || 3:00 
|-
! style=background:white colspan=9 |
|-
|-  bgcolor="#CCFFCC"
| 2010-07-10 || Win ||align=left| Armen Petrosyan || Enfusion Kickboxing tournament '10, Semi Final || Lisbon, Portugal || Ext.R Decision || 4 || 3:00 
|-
|-  bgcolor="#CCFFCC"
| 2010-05-29 || Win ||align=left| Yoshihiro Sato || It's Showtime 2010 Amsterdam || Amsterdam, Netherlands || Decision (Unanimous) || 3 || 3:00 
|-
|-  bgcolor="#CCFFCC"
| 2010-02-13 || Win ||align=left| Chan Sung Jung || It's Showtime 2010 Prague || Prague, Czech Republic || Disq. (Illegal Move) || 1 || 2:05 
|-
|-  bgcolor="#CCFFCC"
| 2010-01-? || Win ||align=left| Shane Campbell || Enfusion Kickboxing tournament '10, 2nd Round || Koh Samui, Thailand || || || 
|-
! style=background:white colspan=9 |
|-
|-  bgcolor="#CCFFCC"
| 2010-01-? || Win ||align=left| Jan van Denderen || Enfusion Kickboxing tournament '10, 1st Round || Koh Samui, Thailand || || || 
|-
|-  bgcolor="#CCFFCC"
| 2009-12-12 || Win ||align=left| Cagri Ermis || Backstreet Fights II || Cologne, Germany || TKO (Corner Stop/Low Kick) || 1 || 
|-
|-  bgcolor="#CCFFCC"
| 2009-09-15 || Win ||align=left| Doungpikart Kor. Sapaotong || Petchpiya Fight, Lumpinee Stadium || Bangkok, Thailand || Decision || 5 || 3:00
|-
|-  bgcolor="#FFBBBB"
| 2008-02-26 || Loss ||align=left| Nongbank Thor Meanburi || Por Pramuk Fights, Lumpinee Stadium || Bangkok, Thailand || Decision || 5 || 3:00
|-
|-  bgcolor="#CCFFCC"
| 2007-06-23 || Win ||align=left| Tarik El Idrissi || K-1 World GP 2007 Amsterdam, Super Fight || Amsterdam, Netherlands || TKO (Injury/Shin) || 1 ||  
|-
|-  bgcolor="#FFBBBB"
| 2007-06-02 || Loss ||align=left| Youness El Mhassani || Gentleman Fight Night 4 || Tilburg, Netherlands || Decision (Unanimous) || 5 || 3:00 
|-
|-  bgcolor="#CCFFCC"
| 2007-04-29 || Win ||align=left| Amir Zeyada || Beatdown Gala || Amsterdam, Netherlands || Decision || 5 || 3:00 
|-
|-  bgcolor="#CCFFCC"
| 2006-06-03 || Win ||align=left| Alviar Lima || Gentleman Fight Night 3 || Tilburg, Netherlands || Decision (Unanimous) || 5 || 3:00
|-
|-  bgcolor="#FFBBBB"
| 2006-03-19 || Loss ||align=left| Youness El Mhassani || SLAMM "Nederland vs Thailand" || Almere, Netherlands || Disq. (Thow) || ||
|-  bgcolor="#CCFFCC"
| 2005-06-12 || Win ||align=left| Tarek Slimani || It's Showtime 2005 Amsterdam || Amsterdam, Netherlands || Decision || 5 || 3:00 
|-
|-  bgcolor="#CCFFCC"
| 2005-04-09 || Win ||align=left| Vincent Vielvoye || Muay Thai Champions League XIV || Amsterdam, Netherlands || Decision || 3 || 3:00 
|-
|-  bgcolor="#FFBBBB"
| 2004-11-14 || Loss ||align=left| Rayen Simson || Muay Thai/Mixed Fight Gala, Sporthal Stedenwijk || Almere, Netherlands || Decision || 5 || 3:00 
|-
|-  bgcolor="#CCFFCC"
| 2004-05-20 || Win ||align=left| Joerie Mes || It's Showtime 2004 Amsterdam || Amsterdam, Netherlands || Decision || 5 || 3:00 
|-
|-  bgcolor="#CCFFCC"
| 2004-03-21 || Win ||align=left| Stjepan Veselic || "Veselic vs. Lumpini's No. 1" || Rotterdam, Netherlands || KO (Elbows) || 3 || 
|-
! style=background:white colspan=9 |
|-
|-  bgcolor="#CCFFCC"
| 2003-08-08 || Win ||align=left|  Lin Jianshen  || The 4th China kung fu VS vocational muay Thai || Bangkok, Thailand || Decision || 5 || 3:00 
|-
|-  bgcolor="#cfc"
| 2003-05-28 || Win||align=left| Chaowalit Jockygym || Lumpinee Stadium || Bangkok, Thailand || Decision || 5 || 3:00

|-  bgcolor="#FFBBBB"
| 2003-03-08 || Loss ||align=left| Kaolan Kaovichit || Lumpinee Stadium || Bangkok, Thailand || Decision (Unanimous) || 5 || 3:00
|-
! style=background:white colspan=9 |
|-
|-  bgcolor="#CCFFCC"
| 2002-07-20 || Win ||align=left| Kaolan Kaovichit || Lumpinee Stadium || Bangkok, Thailand || Decision (Unanimous) || 5 || 3:00
|-
! style=background:white colspan=9 |
|-
|-  bgcolor="#CCFFCC"
| 2002-06-01 || Win ||align=left| Mathee Jadeepitak || Bad to the Bone || Santa Ana Pueblo, NM, USA || TKO (Shoulder injury) ||4 || 
|-
! style=background:white colspan=9 |
|-
|-  bgcolor="#fbb"
| 2002-02-01 || Loss||align=left| Namsaknoi Yudthagarngamtorn || || Pattaya, Thailand || Decision  || 5 || 3:00

|-  bgcolor="#FFBBBB"
| 2001-06-24 || Loss ||align=left| Kaolan Kaovichit || Muay Thai - The World Heritage || Bangkok, Thailand || Decision (Unanimous) || 5 || 3:00
|-
! style=background:white colspan=9 |

|-
|-  bgcolor="#CCFFCC"
| 2000-11-11 || Win ||align=left| Dmitry Shakuta || Thailand vs Belarus || Bangkok, Thailand || Decision || 5 || 3:00
|-
|-
| colspan=9 | Legend:    

|-  bgcolor="#CCFFCC"
| 2002-10-13 || Win ||align=left| Mohammad Aghaei || Asian Games '02, Wushu Final -65 kg || Busan, South Korea || Decision (2-0) || 3 || 2:00
|-
! style=background:white colspan=9 |
|-
|-  bgcolor="#CCFFCC"
| 2002-10-12 || Win ||align=left| Eduard Folayang || Asian Games '02, Wushu Semi Final -65 kg || Busan, South Korea || KO || || 
|-
|-  bgcolor="#CCFFCC"
| 2002-10-11 || Win ||align=left| Shyam Bista || Asian Games '02, Wushu Quarter Final -65 kg || Busan, South Korea || Decision (2-0) || 3 || 2:00 
|-
|-  bgcolor="#CCFFCC"
| 2002-10-10 || Win ||align=left| Choi Young-Min || Asian Games '02, Wushu 1st Round -65 kg || Busan, South Korea || Decision (2-0) || 3 || 2:00 
|-
| colspan=9 | Legend:

See also 
List of It's Showtime events
List of K-1 events
List of male kickboxers

References

1980 births
Living people
Middleweight kickboxers
Welterweight kickboxers
Pajonsuk SuperPro Samui
Pajonsuk SuperPro Samui
Boxers at the 2008 Summer Olympics
Pajonsuk SuperPro Samui
Asian Games medalists in boxing
Asian Games medalists in wushu
Boxers at the 2006 Asian Games
Wushu practitioners at the 2002 Asian Games
Pajonsuk SuperPro Samui
Pajonsuk SuperPro Samui
Pajonsuk SuperPro Samui
Pajonsuk SuperPro Samui
Medalists at the 2002 Asian Games
Medalists at the 2006 Asian Games
Southeast Asian Games medalists in boxing
Pajonsuk SuperPro Samui
Competitors at the 2001 Southeast Asian Games
Welterweight boxers